The 2011 IIFA Awards, officially the 12th International Indian Film Academy Awards ceremony, presented by the International Indian Film Academy honoured the best films of 2010 and took place between 23 and 25 June 2011. The official ceremony took place on 25 June 2011, at the Rogers Centre in Toronto, Ontario, Canada. During the ceremony, IIFA Awards were awarded in 24 competitive categories. The ceremony was televised in India and internationally on Star Plus. Actors Boman Irani and Ritesh Deshmukh co-hosted the ceremony for the fourth time.

In related events, the IIFA Music and Fashion Extravaganza took place on 24 June 2011 at the Ricoh Coliseum. The event was hosted by Karan Johar (Best Director winner) and Anushka Sharma (Best Actress winner). During the event, all technical awards and one musical award were presented to the winners.

Dabangg led the ceremony with 15 nominations, followed by Band Baaja Baaraat and Once Upon a Time in Mumbaai with 12 nominations each, and Ishqiya with 9 nominations.

Dabangg won 10 awards, including Best Film, Best Female Debut (for Sonakshi Sinha) and Best Villain (for Sonu Sood), thus becoming the most-awarded film at the ceremony.

Band Baaja Baaraat and Once Upon a Time in Mumbaai were the runners-up of the ceremony with 5 awards each. Other multiple winners include I Hate Luv Storys, Robot and Udaan with 3 awards each. In addition, Guzaarish, Housefull and Love Sex aur Dhokha, each received 1 award.

Background
This was the first time the IIFA Awards were held in Canada and North America. Toronto's large South Asian population likely influenced the choice as a host city (Ontario is the province with the most Indo-Canadians at 573,250 with 484,655 in the Greater Toronto Area). The award ceremonies are held in various places around the world and has not necessarily been held in locale with a large South Asian population.

The awards ceremony was telecasted on 24 July 2011 on Star Plus.

Winners and nominees

The list of winners of the awards is given below. Winners are listed first, and highlighted in boldface.

Popular awards

Music

Technical

Technical awards

Special awards

Green Globe Award
 Priyanka Chopra

Star Plus Hottest Pair
 Anushka Sharma and Ranveer Singh

Outstanding Achievement in Cinema
 Sharmila Tagore (Indian Cinema)
 Irrfan Khan (International Cinema)

Lifetime Achievement Award
 Sharmila Tagore 
 Asha Bhosle

Multiple nominations and awards

The following eleven films received multiple nominations:
 Fifteen: Dabangg
 Twelve: Band Baaja Baaraat and Once Upon a Time in Mumbaai
 Nine: Ishqiya
 Eight: My Name is Khan and Raajneeti
 Six: Guzaarish
 Four: Golmaal 3
 Three: I Hate Luv Storys, Robot and Udaan

The following four films received multiple awards:
 Ten: Dabangg
 Five: My Name Is Khan and Band Baaja Baaraat
 Three: Robot

Presenters and performers

The following individuals presented awards or performed musical numbers.

Presenters

Performers

Controversies

Shahrukh Khan and stage crasher
While co-hosting the Music Awards, a man jumped on stage and clamped himself to Shahrukh Khan's injured leg. He was later removed from the stage, when Shahrukh said  "You're hurting my leg. Please move!". But, Shahrukh did agree to meet after the show upon the request of the man.

See also
 International Indian Film Academy Awards
 Bollywood
 Cinema of India

References

External links
 IIFA.com Official website
 IIFA Weekend Promotional Website 

Entertainment events in Canada
2011 Indian film awards
IIFA awards